Chief Bearhart (February 1, 1993 – September 18, 2012) was a Canadian Thoroughbred racehorse and sire. A turf specialist, he won six Sovereign Awards and was voted American Champion Male Turf Horse for 1997.

Background 
Chief Bearheart was bred by Richard D. Maynard and sired by Chief's Crown out of the mare Amelia Bearhart by Bold Hour. His grandsire was Danzig. He was owned by Sam-Son Farm of Milton, Ontario and was trained by Mark Frostad.

Racing career 
In 1995, at age two, injuries kept Chief Bearhart out of all but one race. At age 3, he had only modest success until his trainer switched him from racing on dirt tracks to racing on turf. He then won the 1996 Breeders' Stakes, the final and only leg on grass of the Canadian Triple Crown. On July 25, 1996, Chief Bearhart won an allowance race of about a mile and three-eighths on turf at Woodbine Racetrack in a track record time of 2:16 flat.

Popular with racing fans because he almost always came from well back in the field, in 1997 Chief Bearhart blossomed into a star. Ridden by José A. Santos he won five of seven races with two second-place finishes. Among his wins were the prestigious Canadian International Stakes at Woodbine Racetrack and at Hollywood Park Racetrack in the United States he won the Breeders' Cup Turf by a half length. For his 1997 performances, Chief Bearhart earned more than $2 million in purses and was voted the Sovereign Award for Horse of the Year and the Eclipse Award for Outstanding Male Turf Horse.

Racing at age five, in 1998 Chief Bearhart won his second Canadian "Horse of the Year" title after winning the Niagara Breeders' Cup Handicap, the Sky Classic Handicap and  setting a course record in winning the Grade I Manhattan Handicap. He was retired after the 1998 racing season and in 2002 was inducted into the Canadian Horse Racing Hall of Fame.

Stud career 
Chief Bearhart stood at stud at the Shizunai Stallion Station in Japan. He sired six stakes winners for 10 stakes wins. He died of heart failure on September 18, 2012.

Pedigree

References

External links 
 Chief Bearheart - 1997 Breeders Cup Turf (Partial) via YouTube

1993 racehorse births
2012 racehorse deaths
Racehorses bred in Ontario
Racehorses trained in Canada
Horse racing track record setters
Breeders' Cup Turf winners
Eclipse Award winners
Sovereign Award winners
Canadian Thoroughbred Horse of the Year
Canadian Horse Racing Hall of Fame inductees
Thoroughbred family 13-c